The 1980 United States presidential election in West Virginia took place on November 4, 1980, in West Virginia as part of the 1980 United States presidential election.

The Democratic Party candidate, incumbent President Jimmy Carter, won the state over former California Governor Ronald Reagan by 33,356 votes, giving him one of just seven victories in the election. West Virginia gave Carter his third best vote percentage after the District of Columbia and his home state of Georgia, but the only other states he carried were Maryland, Minnesota, Hawaii, and Rhode Island.

Nationally, Reagan won the election with 489 electoral votes and 50.75 percent of the popular vote.

Results

Results by county

References

West Virginia
1980
1980 West Virginia elections